"The Archer" is a song recorded by American singer-songwriter Taylor Swift. As the fifth track on her seventh studio album Lover (2019), the song was written and produced by Swift and Jack Antonoff. On July 23, 2019, it was released as the only promotional single from the album. "The Archer" is a 1980s-influenced ambient ballad combining  synth-pop, synthwave, and dream pop, incorporating heavy skittering synthesizers, soft house beats, minimalistic elements and a slow groove. Praised for its artful lyrics expressing vulnerability, the song introspects on Swift's insecurities, anxiety and existential crisis.

"The Archer" received critical acclaim upon release, with music critics complimenting the poetic lyrics and dreamy production and comparing it to Swift's 2012 song "All Too Well", the fifth track on her fourth studio album Red. On the Billboard Hot 100, it debuted at number 69 and eventually peaked at number 38. A lyric video was also released on YouTube, accompanying the song's release.

Background

The song was first teased as one of the easter eggs in the music video of "You Need to Calm Down", the second single from Lover. In the video, Hayley Kiyoko appears to be wielding a bow and arrow, hitting a bullseye in the center, which has the number 5 stamped on it; fans interpreted it as something to do with the fifth track on Lover. On July 22, 2019, the fifth track on the album was revealed to be a song entitled "The Archer", through an accidental leak in the pre-order tracklist of the album on Apple Music. The following day, "The Archer" was released as the only promotional single from Lover.

Regarding placement of "The Archer" at number five on the Lover tracklist, Swift explained that she puts the most "honest, emotional, vulnerable, and personal" tracks at the position. Swift also stated that the song would not be a single and it was meant to showcase a side of the album unseen by fans with the first two singles ("Me!" and "You Need to Calm Down"). Swift went on to say that the song would not receive an accompanying music video; however, a lyric video accompanied the song's release.

"The Archer" was written and produced by Swift and Jack Antonoff within two hours, when they were in California. The two have also previously collaborated on "Sweeter than Fiction" (2013), 1989 (2014), "I Don't Wanna Live Forever" (2016) and Reputation (2017). The song's title "The Archer" is also a reference to the symbol of Swift's zodiac sun-sign, Sagittarius.

Composition and lyrics

"The Archer" is an airy, minimal, midtempo synth-pop, synthwave, and dream pop ballad, that features heavy and sparkling synthesizers, minimalistic sounds and a slow groove, driven by house-inflected kick drum thumps that build up to a feverish climax. The song, described as "darker and more introspective" than preceding singles, showcases a "more vulnerable and confessional" side of the singer, as it features her as "both hunter and hunted". With the songwriting exuding existentialism, Swift also interpolates lyrics from the nursery rhyme "Humpty Dumpty" to "describe her emotional anguish", then "brings it all back to how her life has been marked by haters and betrayal". Time's Raisa Bruner stated that "The Archer" showcases Swift's introspective side, over a "skittering" synth line, and that it has the 80s sensibility, typical of Antonoff's works.

Critical reception
"The Archer" received widespread critical acclaim upon release. Rolling Stones Claire Shaffer called the song "a somber, synth-heavy ballad centered around the metaphor of the archer". Rania Aniftos of Billboard opined that it is "sparkling, airy", and that Swift "tears down the wall she puts up, asking the person she loves to accept all of her as she chants". Writing for Forbes, Caitlin Kelley stated that the lyrics of "The Archer" scan "as a more nuanced acknowledgment of the well-documented highs and lows of her high-profile relationships", adding that "the song's biggest strength is the artfulness of [its] lines". NMEs Sofiana Ramli wrote that "the song exposes the singer's insecurities", describing it as "delicate and dreamy in the same minimalistic vein" as "All Too Well" (2012). Spin's Jordan Sargent named "The Archer" as the "most stunning" song on Lover.

Chris Willman of Variety opined that its "lyrics reflect a suspicious state of mind in a seemingly happy relationship where old fears arise easily", and also drew comparisons to "All Too Well". Voxs Constance Grady wrote that the song "is spare and minimalist, and it's a little bit self-hating in the way Swift can occasionally get when she's at her most vulnerable as a songwriter", adding that it is "exponentially more emotional and powerful" than preceding singles. Writing for V Magazine, Alex Kazemi called the song "a beautiful classic Taylor Swift ballad, that is both violent and exquisite". He stated that the lyrics are "full of heart-stabbers" that "attest to the songwriting skills and poetics" of Swift, and complimented the "goth-epigrams and glossier production" which "paint a vivid landscape". In 2019, Rob Sheffield of Rolling Stone ranked "The Archer" as Swift's eleventh best song.

Stereogum named "The Archer" as one of the top 10 best songs of 2019. Slant named it the sixth-best song of 2019.

Commercial performance
Following its release, "The Archer" opened on the US Billboard Hot 100 at number 69, becoming Swift's 80th song to enter the chart. The song later peaked at number 38 after the release of Lover—becoming one of the seven top-40 entries from the album. It also reached number six in the Billboard Digital Song Sales chart. In Australia, "The Archer" debuted at number 55, it moved to number 19 the following week. On October 9, 2019, the song received a gold certification from the Australian Recording Industry Association (ARIA). Elsewhere, "The Archer" has charted in several territories, at number 17 in Scotland, number 18 in Singapore, number 22 in Hungary, number 23 in Lithuania, number 28 in both Belgium and New Zealand, number 31 in Ireland, number 32 in Estonia, number 41 in Canada, number 43 in the United Kingdom, number 63 in Slovakia, and number 69 in Czech Republic.

Lyric video and live performances
On July 23, 2019, a lyric video for the song was released on YouTube. The lyrics in the video use a handwritten font, while the background of the video is made up of colorful clouds moving. At the end, there are a few seconds of snow falling down.

Swift's first live performance of the song was an acoustic rendition on the "Lover's Lounge", a Q&A session live streamed on YouTube on August 22, 2019. The next day, she again performed the song acoustically at a SiriusXM Town Hall. The song was included in Swift's setlist for BBC Radio 1's Live Lounge on September 2. On September 9, Swift performed the song at the City of Lover one-off concert in Paris, France. The audio was later released on digital music platforms on May 17, 2020, along with the premiere of the concert film on ABC. Swift included "The Archer" on the set list for the Eras Tour (2023).

Credits, personnel and locations
Credits adapted from Tidal. According to the Lover CD booklet, the song was recorded at Electric Lady Studios (New York City, NY, USA), mixed at Mixstar Studios (Virginia Beach, Virginia, USA) and mastered at Sterling Sound (New York City, New York).
 Taylor Swift – vocals, songwriter, producer
 Jack Antonoff – producer, songwriter, programmer, recording engineer, keyboards
 Laura Sisk – recording engineer
 John Rooney – assistant recording engineer
 Serban Ghenea – mixer
 John Hanes – mix engineer

Charts

Certifications

Release history

References

2019 songs
Taylor Swift songs
Songs written by Taylor Swift
Songs written by Jack Antonoff
Song recordings produced by Taylor Swift
Song recordings produced by Jack Antonoff
Torch songs
American synth-pop songs
Synth-pop ballads
Synthwave songs
Dream pop songs
Electropop ballads
Ambient songs
2010s ballads